Cobra King may refer to:
Cobra King (tank), the first tank to relieve the siege of Bastogne
Cobra King radar, a radar system carried by USNS Howard O. Lorenzen
The Cobra King of Kathmandu, the third novel in the Children of the Lamp trilogy

See also
 King Cobra (disambiguation)